The women's 100 metres event at the 1986 European Athletics Championships was held in Stuttgart, then West Germany, at Neckarstadion on 26 and 27 August 1986.

Medalists

Results

Final
27 August
Wind: 0.8 m/s

Semi-finals
27 August

Semi-final 1
Wind: 0.7 m/s

Semi-final 2
Wind: 1.2 m/s

Heats
26 August

Heat 1
Wind: -1.4 m/s

Heat 2
Wind: -0.1 m/s

Heat 3
Wind: -1.2 m/s

Participation
According to an unofficial count, 24 athletes from 13 countries participated in the event.

 (2)
 (3)
 (1)
 (1)
 (3)
 (1)
 (1)
 (1)
 (3)
 (1)
 (1)
 (3)
 (3)

References

100 metres
100 metres at the European Athletics Championships
1986 in women's athletics